The Brussels Parliament building is a neoclassical building located on the / in Brussels, Belgium, housing the Parliament of the Brussels-Capital Region. It largely dates from the early 20th century, although some wings date back to the 17th century and certain later renovations.

Architecture

The hemicycle is on the top floor of the building, with the roof being of modern zinc and glass design. The chamber is encircled by a long curved wooden wall and there is an overhanging press and public gallery. Committee rooms have likewise been updated with modern technology but much of the building remains neoclassical. There is also a cafeteria and reading room for deputies. The four rear wings have administrative functions, including housing the President's offices.

History
Towards the end of the 17th century, the site housed the vast mansion of the Maes family on /, which was destroyed in 1695 during the bombardment of Brussels in the War of the Grand Alliance. The remains of the mansion and its lands were bought by the Count of Limminghe, Charles van den Berghe, who held numerous posts of administration in Brussels, being twice the city's burgomaster (later mayor). A year later, in 1696, he built another large, prestigious two-story mansion at the end of an enclosed courtyard with a garden (entered via Saint-Jean/Sint-Jan), which was then sold on to various figures such as Apostolic Nuncio and the then-ambassador to England.

The building was acquired by the state for the first time in 1823 when the Brabant Province and the Dutch State bought it to house the Brabant government and act as the official residence of the local governor. This situation continued after Belgian Independence in 1830. Due to development of the provincial government, however, the building became too small and dilapidated by the end of the 1860s, hence there were successive waves of reconstruction, albeit with a planned design for consistency. The governors residence began to be modified in 1885, and in 1907, the office wing was replaced. Georges Hano, the Ministry of Public Works' then-architect, built a higher wing with direct access to the Rue de Chêne. The different buildings were also interlinked and the facades overlooking the courtyard were unified. The governors' residence was increased one story on the side facing the courtyard and the height was also increased on the building surmounting the porch reconstructed by Hansotte. The new / was opened up by the city at the start of the 20th century and Hano desired to make the presence of the provincial government felt on this new road which his complex now bordered. In 1913, works began on a new building, completed in 1930, in a neo-Louis XVI style with a ceremonial entrance hall and lavish decoration.

In 1995, Brussels was split from Brabant and given its own regional government. The Federal Government gave the building to the Brussels-Capital Region, which in turn gave it to the Brussels Regional Parliament, which was searching for a seat. However, it became apparent that the buildings were unsuited for the role of a parliament, leading to the opening of an architectural competition later that year. The resulting changes made included increasing the height of the wing overlooking the Rue du Lombard in order to erect a new hemicycle on the top floor. This added a large modern roof element to the neoclassical design of the building. Committee rooms were given modern equipment and state rooms were restored. Despite the building's renovation, the original dimensions have been retained. A multipurpose hall was also built beneath a hanging garden to create a link between the building's different sections.

Art
Since being taken over by the Brussels Region, the building has hosted various modern works of art maintained by a commission who purchase the works for the Parliament. The Commission is composed of members of the Parliament Office together with eight external observers from the art world. In 1998, this commission entrusted 11 artists to create works for areas of the building;
 Yasmina Assbane for the floral kerchiefs
 Rudi Bogaerts for the artistic area dedicated to the memory of famous personalities
 Patrick Corillon for the "Three stories of Oskar Serti".
 Paul Day for terracotta high-reliefs
 Wim Delvoye for the "Love letter from Mohammed to Caroline"
 Gilbert Fastenakens for the photos transferred to canvas
 Joseph Kosuth for the illuminated frieze
 Guy Leclercq for the re-mounted canvasses
 Michel Mouffe for a set of mirrors and illuminated blocks
 Richard Venlet for the drawings of the electrical installations
 Julien Willem for the Brussels portrait gallery

See also

 Belgian Federal Parliament (federal assembly - upper and lower houses)
 Flemish Parliament (regional and community assembly)
 Walloon Parliament (regional assembly)
 Parliament of the French Speaking Community (community assembly)
 Parliament of the German Speaking Community (community assembly)
 Commission communautaire française (COCOF)
 Vlaamse Gemeenschapscommissie (VGC)

References

Notes

Houses completed in 1696
Office buildings completed in 1907
Buildings and structures completed in 1930
Parliament of the Brussels-Capital Region
Buildings and structures in Brussels
Legislative buildings in Europe
Tourist attractions in Brussels
City of Brussels
1696 establishments in the Holy Roman Empire